Buffy the Vampire Slayer is a 2000 beat 'em up game developed by GameBrains and published by THQ. Based on the television show Buffy the Vampire Slayer, the game features Buffy Summers, who fights vampires, demons, and other supernatural entities as the Slayer. The player controls Buffy through eight side-scrolling levels, and gameplay centers on one-on-one fights with vampires.

Gameplay 
Buffy the Vampire Slayer is a side-scrolling beat 'em up game divided into eight levels, which include a mansion and the Sunnydale zoo. The player controls Buffy Summers, a Slayer destined to fight vampires, demons, and other supernatural entities. Gameplay is focused on one-on-one fights with vampires. Although vampires are the game's only enemy type, there are six variations: tux, punk, disfigured, tribesman, Euro, and guardian. The player fights two master vampires as bosses: a viking and a beast vampire. To defeat them, the player must knock them down and stake them through the heart. A game over occurs when Buffy loses all of her health. Along with attacking, the player can block an enemy's attack, throw them, and roll on the ground.

Levels do not include any obstacles or traps, and while they incorporate platforming, none of the falls are lethal. AllGame's Brett Alan Weiss described the jumping mechanic as "super leaps". The game does not have any collectible items or different weapons. The player can pick up small objects, like paint cans, to throw at a vampire, but they can only be used when an enemy is onscreen. Levels also have power-ups, such as soda cans that provide "super punches and kicks". Each level ends with a password which functions as the game's save points that allow players to replay the level. While Buffy is the game's only playable character, other Buffy the Vampire Slayer characters appear in cutscenes between levels.

Plot 
The game is set in the show's fourth season of the television show Buffy the Vampire Slayer.

Development and release 

Buffy the Vampire Slayer was developed by GameBrains and published by THQ. In March 2000, THQ announced the game as part of a partnership with Fox Interactive. The game discussed in this announcement was set for a 2000 release. Both companies would collaborate for a second Buffy the Vampire Slayer video game in 2003 for Buffy the Vampire Slayer: Wrath of the Darkhul King. A pre-alpha demo was available at E3 in May 2000, before being released on September 19, 2000, as a Game Boy Color exclusive. The game was not backward compatible with the Game Boy.

Critical reception

References

Footnotes

Citations 

 
 
  
 
 }
 
 
  
 
 
 
 

2000 video games
Beat 'em ups
Game Boy Color games
Game Boy Color-only games
THQ games
Video games about witchcraft
Video games based on Buffy the Vampire Slayer
Video games developed in Malaysia
Video games set in California